Richard Slee may refer to:

Richard Thilthorpe Slee (1879–1935), mining engineer
Richard Slee (artist) (born 1946), British ceramic artist